Kernot is a surname. Notable people with the surname include:

 Cheryl Kernot (born 1948), Australian politician and academic
 William Charles Kernot (1845–1909), Australian engineer

See also
 Kernot railway station, Victoria